Thomas H. Todd III is a lieutenant general in the United States Army who is Deputy Commanding General of Acquisition and Systems at United States Army Futures Command in Texas.

Previously, Todd was Program executive officer of Aviation at Redstone Arsenal in Alabama. He was Deputy Commanding General of United States Army Combat Capabilities Development Command in Maryland, and Senior Commander of Natick Soldier Systems Center in Massachusetts.

In 1989 Todd was commissioned a second lieutenant at The Citadel where he majored in business administration. An army aviator, he deployed on both Operation Enduring Freedom (Afghanistan) and Operation Iraqi Freedom. Todd is a graduate of the OH-58 and H-60 Maintenance Test Pilot Course, the Army Aviation Officer Advanced Course, and the Command and General Staff Officer Course. He has a master's degree in contract management from the Florida Institute of Technology, and a master's in strategic studies from the United States Air Force Air War College.

References

United States Army generals
Year of birth missing (living people)
Living people
The Citadel, The Military College of South Carolina alumni
Florida Institute of Technology alumni
Place of birth missing (living people)
Lieutenant generals
United States Army aviators